The following is a list of notable events that are related to Philippine music in 2016.

Events

January
 January 1 – Myx introduces the four new VJs of the channel, Sharlene San Pedro, Jairus Aquino, Sarah Carlos and Alex Diaz.
 January 9 – Members from the classic line-up of Rivermaya consisting of Perf de Castro, Nathan Azarcon, Mark Escueta and Rico Blanco reunite at 19 East, Taguig City after an invitation from de Castro following his gig. The gig, which they dubbed as a "secret semi-reunion", was composed of Blanco on keyboards, de Castro on guitars, Azarcon on bass guitar and Escueta on drums. Blanco and de Castro simultaneously switch over lead vocals all throughout the performance while Azarcon and Escueta provided backing vocals. Bamboo Mañalac was invited as well, however it was reported that he was out of the country on that date.
 January 24 – During an episode of Sunday PinaSaya on GMA Network, Julie Anne San Jose receives her triple platinum award for her 2nd album, Deeper.
 January 26 – Darren Espanto takes 7 awards including the Young Artist of the Year award in the 1st Wish Music Awards at the Smart Araneta Coliseum, organized by FM radio station Wish 1075.
 January 31 – Alden Richards, the other half of the phenomenal loveteam Aldub, receives his triple platinum award for his best-selling album, Wish I May, during an episode of Sunday Pinasaya, also on GMA.
 January 31 – After 10 years, rapper Gloc-9 signed a record deal with Star Music the music arm of ABS-CBN Corporation and the record label who introduced Gloc-9 to mainstream listeners. Two of the most successful albums of Gloc-9, G9 and Ako Si... were released under Star Records back in 2003 and 2005 respectively. These albums brought Gloc-9's biggest smash hits with songs like Simpleng Tao and Hinahanap Ng Puso (feat. Hannah Romawac of Session Road).
 January 31 – Ebe Dancel, formerly the vocalist of Sugarfree launched his album "Bawat Daan" at Eastwood Central Plaza. The album art, which features Ebe on a stroll through UP Los Baños’ Freedom Park, conjures up a picture of nostalgia, and yet, it is also a movement towards a new chapter for his artistry. Coincidentally, the musician tells the crowd that this album launch is somewhat a send-off party for him, as he moves back to his hometown of Los Baños, Laguna. The song from which the album gets its name, Bawat Daan, is an ode to a lover, the only constant in a world of doubts. It was originally composed for the stage musical Sa Wakas, which featured the music of Sugarfree. He officially launched it in Entablado Cafe in Los Baños on March 10.

February
 February 20 – The song AlDub You, MaAlden Kita, composed by Ritchi Ramos and Richie Austria crowns as the winner of the AlDub Songwriting Contest organized by Eat Bulaga!
 February 29 – Ma. Jinky Banzon of Barangay 360, Santa Cruz, Manila crowns as the grand champion of the Tinig ng Maynila held at the San Andres Sports Complex. The competition was a project between the Manila government and Viva Live.

March
 March 15 – Nadine Lustre has 5 wins (Favorite Song, Favorite Collaboration with James Reid, Favorite Music Video, Favorite Artist and Favorite Female Artist). While Abra won the first Best Music Video. And, Ogie Alcasid was the MYX Magna Awardee.
 March 30 – The music of late rapper Francis Magalona is used for the musical Three Stars and a Sun, as the closing presentation of the Philippine Educational Theater Association's 47th theater season.

April
 April 23 – Yohan Hwang, a Korean tourist based in Manila, bags the first Grand Touristar title of the reality competition show I Love OPM at the Newport Performing Arts Theater of Resorts World Manila in Pasay.

May
 May 15 – ASAP launched two singing groups, the ASAP Birit Queens, composed of Jona Viray, Morissette, Klarisse de Guzman and Angeline Quinto and the ASAP Soul Sessions, composed of Jason Dy, Daryl Ong, Jay R, KZ Tandingan and Kyla.

July
 July 17 – The all-male group Tres Kantos, of Bugoy Drilon, Jovit Baldivino, and former Tawag ng Tanghalan contestant Dominador Aviola, also known as Daddy D, mentored by Erik Santos was named the first winner of the celebrity competition We Love OPM during the show's live finale at Resorts World Manila.
 July 23 – Di Na Muli, interpreted by Itchyworms, wins this year's Philippine Popular Music Festival held at the KIA Theater.

August
 August 1 – Myx introduced two new other VJs, Sunny Kim and Donny Pangilinan.
 August 27 – Joshua Oliveros, coached by Lea Salonga won the third season of The Voice Kids held at the Newport Performing Arts Theater, Resorts World Manila.

September
 September 15 – Billboard Philippines was officially launched.

November
 November 11 - Filipino girl group DIVAS staged their first concert at the Smart Araneta Coliseum called DIVAS Live in Manila.

December
 December 11 – Niel Murillo, Russell Reyes, Ford Valencia, Tristan Ramirez and Joao Constancia were named as the winners of the Pinoy Boyband Superstar and they will officially be called BoybandPH.

Debuts

Soloist
 Bailey May
 Darlene Vibares
 Derrick Monasterio
 Gabby Alipe
 JC de Vera
 Kenneth Rey Parsad (psalmist during the Pope Francis' mass in the Manila Cathedral in 2015)
 Liza Soberano
 Ylona Garcia
 Zeus Collins

Bands/groups
 Moombahton Players
 Ex Battalion
 CH4RMD
 Top One Project (T.O.P.)
 Sugar 'N Spice
 #Hashtags
 Migz and Maya
 BoybandPH
 Apartel
 Leanne and Naara
 Banna Harbera

Reunion/comebacks
Donna Cruz

Disbandment

Albums released
The following albums are released in 2016 locally. Note: All soundtracks are not included in this list.

Concerts and music festivals

January–March

April–June

July–September

Note 1. Hardwell was originally part of the lineup but cancelled his booking due to uncertain reasons.

October–December

Note 2. Rachelle Ann Go was originally part of the lineup, but pulled out due to scheduling conflicts.

Cancelled events

Awarding ceremonies
 January 26 – 1st Wish 107.5 Music Awards, organized by Wish 1075
 March 15 – Myx Music Awards 2016, organized by myx
 August 7 – MOR Pinoy Music Awards 2016, organized by MOR 101.9 For Life!
 October 23 – 8th PMPC Star Awards for Music, organized by the Philippine Movie Press Club
 December 7 – 29th Awit Awards, organized by the Philippine Association of the Record Industry

Deaths
 August
 August 4 – Snaffu Rigor, veteran composer (b. 1947)
 November 21 – Blakdyak, singer, actor, comedian (b.1969)

References

 
Philippines
Music
Philippine music industry